Gruža may refer to:

 Gruža River, a river in Serbia.
 Gruža (region), a region in Serbia.
 Gruža (village), a village in Serbia.
 Gruža Lake, a lake in Serbia.